Day for Darfur is an international advocacy campaign that works to bring together activists in cities around the globe in calling for action on the crisis in Darfur, western Sudan.

The Day for Darfur was originally conceived by a group of NGOs working on Darfur concerned about the slow response of the international community to the crisis.  Key participating organisations include Aegis Trust, Amnesty International, Human Rights Watch, International Crisis Group, and Save Darfur Coalition. There have been four Days for Darfur called since the first took place on September 17, 2006, each focusing on a call to governments and international bodies.

First Day for Darfur 
On September 17, 2006 the Globe for Darfur coalition marked the first anniversary of the signing of the 2005 UN World Summit Outcome Document by holding the first Global Day for Darfur. More than 60 events in 42 cities were held, calling for UN peacekeepers to be deployed to the Darfur region of Sudan to support the chronically understaffed African Union Mission in Sudan (AMIS) force.

Second Day for Darfur 

December 10, 2006 raised the issue of rape and sexual violence in Darfur and called on world leaders to work with the African Union and its member states to make protecting women from rape a priority for AMIS, including an increase in the number of female AMIS police officers and translators in Darfur and extension of firewood patrols around all internally displaced people (IDP) camps.  Further calls were made towards the Government of Sudan, to allow humanitarian organisations to have free and unfettered access to help victims of rape and other forms of sexual violence and to hold perpetrators of rape and sexual assault accountable for their crimes.  
A number of leading stateswomen released an open letter on the day, calling for the immediate deployment of a robust international peacekeeping force to protect Darfuri women and children. Signatories included: Madeleine Albright, Graça Machel, Mary Robinson, Carol Bellamy, Hanan Ashrawi, Glenys Kinnock, Édith Cresson, Sigrid Rausing, Professor Fatima Babiker Mahmoud, Wendy Ruth Sherman, Professor Dr. Herta Däubler-Gmelin, Nicole Fontaine, Agnes Nyoka Peter, Yakin Erturk, Emma Bonino, and Hina Jilani.

Third Day for Darfur 
On April 29, 2007 the Globe for Darfur coalition marked the fourth anniversary of the Darfur crisis with events taking place in more than 200 cities calling on the UN Secretary-General to demand that governments pressure all sides to stop the violence, respect the ceasefire and end opposition to the hybrid force.  Activists were joined by a number of high-profile figures who called on the international community to protect the civilians of Darfur, including: George Clooney, Hugh Grant, Bob Geldof, Don Cheadle, Sir Elton John, David Furnish, Sir Mick Jagger, Mark Knopfler, Thandie Newton, Emmanuel Jal, Mia Farrow, Mariella Frostrup, and Alex James.

Fourth Day for Darfur 
September 16, 2007 was held in anticipation of the opening of the United Nations General Assembly in New York, calling on the UN General Assembly to keep the Darfur crisis in the spotlight and ensure the full and expeditious deployment of the UNAMID peacekeeping force.  Prior to the Day for Darfur events, a group of high-profile women visited Darfuri IDPs in camps across the border in Chad and a number of women called on world leaders to step up pressure on all parties in the conflict to agree to an immediate ceasefire.  This group included Chimamanda Ngozi Adichie, Asha Haji Elmi, Maria Barroso, Cate Blanchett, Herta Däubler-Gmelin, Binet Diop, Mia Farrow, Mariella Frostrup, Ana Gomes, Germaine Greer, Isabel Jonet, Musimbi Kanyoro, Angélique Kidjo, Kathleen Kennedy Townsend, Kerry Kennedy, Manuela Ferreira Leite, Elle Macpherson, Rosa Mota, Dr. Ngozi Okonjo-Iweala, Eva Padberg, Sigrid Rausing, Mary Robinson, Dame Anita Roddick, Deborah Scroggins, and Jane Wales.

There was also a song released on the Day for Darfur by UK group Mattafix.  The video for the song was filmed in Chad and features Matt Damon, Don Cheadle, Archbishop Desmond Tutu, Elle Macpherson, and The Black Eyed Peas. The project was funded by Mick Jagger.

Participating organisations 

24 Hours for Darfur
Aegis Students
Aegis Trust
American Jewish Committee
American Jewish World Service
Amnesty International
Bahrain Society for Public Freedom and Democracy Support
Cairo Institute for Human Rights Studies
Centre for Minority Rights Development
Collectif Urgence Darfour
Darfur Australia Network
Darfur Call
Darfur Consortium
Darfur Relief and Documentation Centre
Darfur Union
Dream for Darfur
Enough Project
European Union of Jewish Students
FEMNET
Fidelity Out of Sudan
Genocide Intervention Network
Habonim Dror
Human Rights First
Human Rights Watch
Independent Advocacy Project
International Crisis Group
International Federation for Human Rights
International Refugee Rights Initiative
Investors Against Genocide
Italians for Darfur
Medbridge
Minority Rights Group International
Mothers' Union
National Association of Seadogs International
National Union of Students (United Kingdom)
Pears Foundation
People Against Injustice
Physicians for Human Rights
RADDHO
CCJO René Cassin
Rettet Darfur
Sauver Le Darfour
Save Darfur Canada / Sauvons le Darfour Canada
Save Darfur Coalition
Service for Peace
Silent Masses
Society for Threatened Peoples
Socio-Economic Rights and Accountability Project
Soroptimist International
STAND Canada
STAND USA
Stop Genocide Now
Sudan Organisation Against Torture
Unitarian Universalist Service Committee
United Nations Association – UK
UN Watch
DARFUR PEACE AND JUSTICE- Belgium
Waging Peace
Women Initiative Nigeria
World Evangelical Alliance

See also
Darfur conflict
History of Darfur
Sudan

References

External links
Globefordarfur.org - Archived version of Campaign website.

War in Darfur
International observances